Adicrophleps is a genus of humpless casemaker caddisflies in the family Brachycentridae. There is one described species in Adicrophleps, A. hitchcocki.

References

Further reading

 
 
 

Trichoptera genera
Articles created by Qbugbot